Michelle Kathleen Monkhouse (April 7, 1991 – February 17, 2011) was a Canadian fashion model active from late 2000s to early 2010s before dying in a road accident at the age of 19.

Biography
Born and growing up in Toronto, Monkhouse began modeling when she was in Grade 9 at Earl Haig Secondary School, taking part in Toronto Fashion Week and appearing on fashion magazines. Scouted by Ford Models, she took part in New York Fashion Week in 2009.

NY F/W '09
She appeared in the 2009 Fall/Winter New York Fashion Week shows as one of Ford's Top 50 featured new-faces, walking along with numerous other Ford's featured models including Ariel Meredith, Chanel Iman, Hyoni Kang, Jennifer Messelier, Kendra Spears and Lakshmi Menon.

Death
On the morning of February 17, 2011, Monkhouse, then a first-year health and nutrition student at Ryerson University, was driving to her barn in Stouffville, Ontario to ride her horse when black ice caused her to swerve into oncoming traffic, killing her instantly. She was 19 years old.

See also
List of people who died in road accidents

References

1991 births
2011 deaths
Female models from Ontario
People from Toronto
Road incident deaths in Canada
Accidental deaths in Ontario